P. J. Narayanan  (born 1963 in Alwaye, Kerala) is a professor at the International Institute of Information Technology, Hyderabad, and the institute's current director since April 2013. He is known for his work in computer vision (3D reconstruction, structure-from-motion, computational displays), computer graphics (ray-tracing of implicit surfaces, dynamic scenes), and parallel computing on the GPU (graph algorithms, string sorting, ML techniques like graph cuts, ANN and clustering, as well as several computer vision tasks).

Early life 

Narayanan obtained his B. Tech degree in computer science and engineering from Indian Institute of Technology, Kharagpur in 1984. Narayanan graduated with a master's degree from University of Maryland, College Park, US in 1989 and obtained his Ph.D in computer science from University of Maryland, College Park, US in 1991 where he worked with Prof. Larry Davis.

Career 

Narayanan started his career in the Lipi group of the R&D group of CMC Ltd and helped design the second generation hardware for their Indian language word processor. He moved to University of Maryland for graduate studies in 1986. He worked as a research faculty member at the Robotics Institute of Carnegie Mellon University. He was instrumental in building the virtualized reality system that for the first time captured dynamic events in 3D from multiple points of view. The events so captured could be integrated into a virtual reality environment for visualization and manipulation.

He joined the Centre for Artificial Intelligence and Robotics (CAIR), a DRDO lab, in 1996. He headed the Computer Vision and Virtual Reality groups of CAIR and was instrumental in initiating several VR applications for DRDO and the defence. He moved to IIIT-Hyderabad in 2000 and established the Centre for Visual Information Technology (CVIT), which has grown into the largest research group in India in the areas of computer vision, graphics, and medical image processing.

Prof. Narayanan has played crucial roles in several editions of the Indian Conference on Computer Vision, Graphics, and Image Processing (ICVGIP). He was also instrumental in bringing the Asian Conference on Computer Vision (ACCV) to Hyderabad in 2006. He has been an Area Chair for ICCV, CVPR, ACCV, IJCAI, etc.

He was appointed the Co-Chair of the ACM India Council when it was formed. He became the first President of ACM India in 2012 and is the Chair of the ACM India Research Board from 2014. He has played several roles in the Association for Computing Machinery including being in the Nominations Committee and the committee to decide on the Outstanding Contributions to ACM award.

Awards and recognitions 

 Fellow of the Indian National Academy of Engineering (INAE) in 2016
 Association for Computing Machinery (ACM) Presidential Award, 2013
 Best Industry Paper Honourable Mention Award in the British Machine Vision Conference (BMVC), 2018
 Best GPU paper in the High Performance Computing (HiPC), 2013
 Best paper in Eurographics Symposium on Parallel Graphics and Visualization (EGPGV), 2010 
 CUDA Fellow in recognition of contributions to GPGPU by Nvidia Corporation in 2008 
 Best applications paper International Conference on Multisensor Fusion and Integration (MFI), 1996

References

Major professional contributions 

Narayanan has contributed to the areas of computer vision, computer graphics and parallel processing. In computer vision his early work on 3D recovery of dynamic scenes through virtualized reality has resulted in tremendous growth in 3D capture to be available to end users. Capture of 3D has now become common place through the Microsoft Kinect and other commodity sensors. He pioneered the use of innovative platforms like the GPU for common computer vision applications such as graph cuts, neural networks, clustering etc. Use of the GPU in computer vision has culminated in the GPUs making Deep Learning practical for several applications. His work on general parallel computing involving CPUs and GPUs has also been recognized worldwide.

External links
 
 Microsoft Academic

Living people
Indian computer scientists
1963 births
Scientists from Kerala
University of Maryland, College Park alumni
IIT Kharagpur alumni
Carnegie Mellon University faculty